The men's doubles tennis competition, part of the 1931 U.S. National Championships, was held from August 25 to September 2, 1931 on the outdoor grass courts at the Longwood Cricket Club in Chestnut Hill, MA, United States. Third-seeded Wilmer Allison and John Van Ryn defeated fourth-seeded Gregory Mangin and Berkeley Bell 6–4, 8–6, 6–3 in the final to win the title.

Seeds
Nine teams of players were seeded for the men's doubles event; eight U.S. teams and one foreign team. Wilmer Allison and John Van Ryn were the champion; others show the round in which they were eliminated.

The eight seeded U.S. teams were:

  George Lott /  John Doeg (quarterfinals)
  Ellsworth Vines /  Keith Gledhill (quarterfinals)
  Wilmer Allison /  John Van Ryn (champions)
  Gregory Mangin /  Berkeley Bell (finals)
  Frank Shields /  Sidney Wood (quarterfinals)
  Jack Tidball /  Lester Stoefen (second round)
  Eddie Jacobs /  Wilbur Coen (quarterfinals)
  Clifford Sutter /  Bruce Barnes (semifinals)

The foreign seeded team was:
  Fred Perry /  George P. Hughes (quarterfinals)

Draw

Finals

References

Men's Doubles
U.S. National Championships (tennis) by year – Men's doubles